Bailey Nelson (registered as Ben Buckler Eyewear Limited) is an Australian multinational optical retail chain, which operates mainly in Australia, New Zealand, Canada and the UK. Bailey Nelson is, as of 2021, a privately held company. 

The chain offers optician services for eyesight testing and sells glasses, sunglasses, and contact lenses. Blue light filters have been available for an additional fee on Bailey Nelson glasses as early as Jan 2019, if not earlier.

The company has more than 100 branches in Australia, New Zealand, Canada and the UK.

History 
Bailey Nelson was founded in 2012 by Nick Perry and Peter Winkle in the Bondi Beach area of Sydney, NSW. Perry says they received no outside funding at the start, investing $80,000 of their own savings. 

The company started with offering glasses and ventured into contact lenses (including their own store brand) in 2016, if not earlier. They introduced optometry services in their stores in 2014. 

They started their operations in Australia. Bailey Nelson entered Canada in 2014, though had to shut stores in 2017 due to severing a “licensee agreement”. They have since re-entered the Canadian market. In 2019, they “continue(d) to aggressively expand” in Canada, with 15 stores as of November 2019, with the plan to “open seven to eight locations (in the 2019 financial year)”. In  2015, they had 4 branches in the UK. Also in 2015, they opened up shop in Wellington, New Zealand.

Business strategy and partnerships 
Part of the way in which Bailey Nelson, and other companies like them, are able to stay competitive is by changing suppliers, and likely working with more independent producers. High level, Bailey Nelson states their purpose is to bypass the "unfair and overpriced" eyewear market with direct-to-consumer alternatives. The product is vertically integrated, with acetate frames designed in-house in Sydney and produced in factories overseas.  They also focus strongly on a luxury in-store experience, with the aim to turn a “clinical” optician and glasses purchase process into “one of life’s pleasures.”

At a product level, Bailey Nelson started with optical glasses and sunglasses, later expanding to contact lenses. They also offer blue light filters, though some doubt the efficacy of said blue light filters.  By default their optical and sunglasses have anti-glare and scratch resistant coatings included in the price.

All frames are designed in house and produced by manufacturers in China. The acetate they source is from the company Mazzucchelli 1849, based in Italy. Mazzuchhelli also assisted them in choosing factories to partner with.

Bailey Nelson have reentered the partnership opportunity space, this time in New Zealand and Australia. It's a co-investment model that allows optometrists to own a portion of a Bailey Nelson location, while Bailey Nelson - in short - manages the overhead costs like systems, training, supply chain and other support systems.

In Australia, they collaborated with Eugene Tan, the founder and photographer of Aquabumps, in 2015 to launch a capsule sunglasses collection available for a limited time.

In 2019, 2020 and 2021, Bailey Nelson participated in “Afterpay day”, also known as AfterYAY day. In many of the countries they operate in, they also offer student discounts or limited-time offers, including Black Friday deals. 

In 2020, they responded to COVID-19 by shutting all stores globally, by 27 Mar. By 21 Nov 2020, stores in Australia were re-opening in line with individual state guidelines. Each individual region has had different and staggered responses to COVID-19 protocol.

Business Future 

Co-founder Nick Perry stated in 2019 that in the Canadian market, their longer term goal was to be at 50 locations in Canada. With this comes a three-part strategy: focus on optometry, build engaged, passionate staff, and deliver quality differentiating product. This strategy is in part due to the differing medicare coverages of eyecare in Canada versus Australia, the market they started in.

They also have private advisors, including Delaney Schweitzer. As of March 2021, there have been reports of a new investment funding round via Goldman Sachs to help support reportedly aggressive growth plans in all markets in the coming years.

References 

Opticians
Companies based in Sydney
Retail companies established in 2012